Bakhtiyar Kuanyshuly Tolegenov (born January 5, 1976) is a retired boxer from Kazakhstan, who competed for his native country in the Men's Featherweight (– 57 kg) division at the 1996 Summer Olympics in Atlanta, Georgia. There he was defeated in the first round by USA's eventual bronze medalist Floyd Mayweather Jr.

References
sports-reference

External links
 

1976 births
Living people
Featherweight boxers
Boxers at the 1996 Summer Olympics
Olympic boxers of Kazakhstan
Kazakhstani male boxers
20th-century Kazakhstani people